Graeme Douglas Johnstone (17 May 1945 – 16 November 2012) was the state coroner of Victoria, Australia from 1994 to 2007. He retired on 29 November 2007, and was replaced by Judge Jennifer Coate. He is noted for often personally visiting the scenes of deaths that fell within his jurisdiction.

Early life and education
Johnstone was born on 17 May 1945. He was educated at Geelong College and Monash University, where he obtained a Bachelor of Laws and a Bachelor of Jurisprudence.

Career
Johnstone held inquests into many famous deaths. In 2005, he conducted a coronial inquest into the death of Prime Minister Harold Holt and found that he had accidentally drowned near Cheviot Beach in Victoria. This disappointed advocates of conspiracy theories, such as the hypothesis that he was kidnapped by a Chinese submarine. He has also held a long-running series of inquests into the death of Jaidyn Leskie.

Later life and death
Upon his retirement, Victorian Attorney-General Rob Hulls praised Johnstone for his outstanding commitment to investigating deaths in custody. Johnstone will be coming out of retirement in February 2008 for the conclusion of the inquest into the disappearance and death of Louise and Charmian Faulkner who went missing in 1980.

Johnstone died on 16 November 2012, at the age of 67.

References

External links 
 Coroner's Office of Victoria

1945 births
2012 deaths
Australian coroners
Monash Law School alumni